Zoë Carroll Chao (born September 19, 1985) is an American television and stage actress and screenwriter, principally known for her role as Isobel in Strangers, and Zoe in The Afterparty.

Early life
Chao was born in Providence, Rhode Island, United States. Her mother is white with Irish and English ancestry, and her father is a second-generation Chinese American. Chao has stated that she grew up in a family of visual artists. After graduating from The Wheeler School in 2004, she received her BA in art history from Brown University and her MFA from the graduate acting program at UCSD.

Career
Chao has participated in theatre productions, including La Jolla Playhouses' Sideways, Surf Report, and WoW Festivals' Our Town, and Ensemble Theatre Company's Amadeus. In 2016, she appeared in the Off Broadway play Friend Art at Second Stage. She has worked with directors Christopher Guest, Les Waters, Ping Chong and Chris Ashley.

Chao also starred in her own TV series, The God Particles, which she wrote and produced. She co-produced the 2017 short Like Animals. She is perhaps best known for starring as Isobel in Strangers, the first three episodes of which were screened at the Sundance Film Festival.

In 2022, Chao was in the main cast of the Apple TV+ mystery comedy series The Afterparty.

Personal life
During the filming of Strangers, Chao relocated from New York City to Los Angeles.

Filmography

Film

Television

Awards and nominations

|-
| 2015
| Best Female Performance in a Comedy
| International Academy of Web Television Awards
| 
|}

References

External links
 

1985 births
Living people
Actors from Providence, Rhode Island
Actresses from Rhode Island
21st-century American actresses
21st-century American screenwriters
21st-century American women writers
American actresses of Chinese descent
American film actresses
American people of English descent
American people of Irish descent
American television actresses
American television writers
American women television writers
Brown University alumni
Screenwriters from Rhode Island
University of California, San Diego alumni
Writers from Providence, Rhode Island